The 1961 New Jersey State Senate elections were held on November 5.

The elections took place alongside the election of Governor Richard J. Hughes. Ten of New Jersey's 21 counties elected Senators; no seats changed hands.

Incumbents not running for re-election

Democratic 
All four Democratic Senators up for re-election ran for another term.

Republican 
 Walter H. Jones (Bergen) (ran for Governor)
 Wesley Lance (Hunterdon)

Summary of results by county

Close races 
Seats where the margin of victory was under 10%:

Atlantic

Bergen

Cumberland

Hudson

Hunterdon

Mercer 

Remarkably, Senator Ridolfi received the exact same number of votes he had received in 1957.

Morris

Ocean

Passaic

Sussex

References 

New Jersey State Senate elections
New Jersey State Senate